David Embleton Smith (born 18 November 1945) is a former English cricketer.  Smith was a right-handed batsman who bowled right-arm medium pace.  He was born in Harpenden, Hertfordshire.

Smith made his debut for Buckinghamshire in the 1967 Minor Counties Championship against Hertfordshire.  Smith played Minor counties cricket for Buckinghamshire from 1967 to 1988, which included 143 Minor Counties Championship matches and 9 MCCA Knockout Trophy matches.  In 1974, he made his List A debut against Kent in the Gillette Cup.  He played 5 further List A matches for Buckinghamshire, the last coming against Warwickshire in the 1987 NatWest Trophy.  In his 6 List A matches, he scored 112 runs at a batting average of 22.40, with a single half century high score of 54.  This came against Lancashire in the 1984 NatWest Trophy.

References

External links
David Smith at ESPNcricinfo
David Smith at CricketArchive

1945 births
Living people
People from Harpenden
Cricketers from Hertfordshire
English cricketers
Buckinghamshire cricketers
Buckinghamshire cricket captains